Personality of the year is a title awarded by a number of organisations or publications, such as:

BBC Sports Personality of the Year
RTÉ Sports Person of the Year
Radio Music Awards
Radio and Records